Northfork is a 2003 fantasy drama film directed by Michael Polish and written by Michael and Mark Polish. It premiered at the Sundance Film Festival on January 21, 2003 and later received a limited release in the United States on July 11, 2003. The film stars Duel Farnes, James Woods, Nick Nolte, Michele Hicks, Daryl Hannah, Anthony Edwards, Robin Sachs, Ben Foster, Claire Forlani, Clark Gregg, Kyle MacLachlan and Peter Coyote. This is the brothers' third film collaboration, after Twin Falls Idaho (1999) and Jackpot (2001).

Plot

The film's narrative consists of several interwoven subplots taking place in the town of Northfork, Montana circa 1955. A new dam is being built which will flood the valley of Northfork, and the town is in the midst of an evacuation. The narratives focus on several individuals who, for one reason or another, have yet to evacuate. 

Walter O'Brien and his son are on the evacuation team, helping to evacuate the last few inhabitants of Northfork. In return, the government will give them acres of lakeside property if they meet their evacuee quota.  Father Harlan is one such individual, who has stayed behind to care for Irwin, a dying orphan too weak to leave town. 

While the O'Briens and their co-workers encounter an array of unusual characters, Irwin discovers that he is the "unknown angel" through a suitcase with his angel wings in it and a Bible with an angel's feather telling his family 'story', and finds himself a family of angels in his dreams,  who he makes a deal with to take him 'a thousand miles'.

Cast
Duel Farnes as Irwin
James Woods as Walter O'Brien
Nick Nolte as Father Harlan
Peter Coyote as Eddie
Claire Forlani as Mrs. Hadfield
Clark Gregg as Mr. Hadfield (uncredited)
Mark Polish as Willis O'Brien
Kyle MacLachlan as Mr. Hope
Michele Hicks as Mrs. Hope
Ben Foster as Cod
Daryl Hannah as Flower Hercules
Robin Sachs as Cup of Tea
Anthony Edwards as Happy
Jon Gries as Arnold
Rick Overton as Rudolph
Douglas Sebern as Mayor
Josh Barker as Matt

Reception
Northfork received mixed to positive reviews from critics and has a rating of 57% on Rotten Tomatoes based on 103 reviews with an average rating of 6 out of 10. The consensus states "Visually poetic, but may be too dramatically inert for some." The film also has a score of 64 on Metacritic based on 31 reviews.

References

External links

Northfork on Rotten Tomatoes.com
Northfork

2003 films
2000s fantasy drama films
Films set in 1955
Films set in Montana
Films shot in Montana
Paramount Vantage films
American fantasy drama films
Films directed by Michael Polish
2003 drama films
2000s English-language films
2000s American films